Thep Mongkhon is a tambon (subdistrict) of Bang Sai District, in Phra Nakhon Si Ayutthaya Province, Thailand. In 2017 it had a total population of 3,851 people.

Administration

Central administration
The tambon is subdivided into 8 administrative villages (muban).

Local administration
The whole area of the subdistrict is covered by the subdistrict administrative organization (SAO) Thep Mongkhon (องค์การบริหารส่วนตำบลเทพมงคล).

References

External links
Thaitambon.com on Thep Mongkhon

Tambon of Phra Nakhon Si Ayutthaya Province